Podesta Baldocchi is one of the oldest operating florists in San Francisco, founded in 1871. Their headquarters on 224 Grant Avenue was featured in Alfred Hitchcock's 1958 film Vertigo. In November 2001, San Francisco native Marc Rovetti took ownership of Podesta Baldocchi. Marc's father had emigrated from Italy in the 1950s and had worked at Podesta Baldocchi before starting his own floral business. Today Podesta Baldocchi continues as an online business, delivering flowers around the Bay Area.

References

External links 
 

Companies established in 1871
Florists
Retail companies based in California